Carl Brown Squier (April 17, 1893 – November 5, 1967) was a World War I aviation pioneer and vice president of Lockheed Corporation. He sold Charles Lindbergh his Sirius airplane in 1931. He was the 13th licensed pilot in the United States.

Biography
Carl Brown Squier was born in Decatur, Michigan on April 17, 1893.

On Monday, May 16, 1938 at 2:07 p.m. a new Lockheed Model 14 Super Electra was carrying Northwest Airlines and Lockheed Corporation employees and family members. The aircraft took off from Burbank Airport for Las Vegas, Nevada, where the aircraft was to be formally turned over to Northwest Airlines, and then it was to be flown to St. Paul, Minnesota to the airline's headquarters. The plane was flying in fog above the Mint Canyon when it crashed at 3,300 feet in the Sierra Pelona Mountains, 27 minutes after taking off from Burbank. All seven passengers on board, including a three-year-old boy and an infant girl, were killed instantly. Among the victims were Frederick Whittemore, 42, a pilot and vice-president of operations at Northwest Airlines, and Lenna Squier, 34, Squier's wife. Squier was in Chicago when his wife was killed.

Squier died of cancer in Los Angeles on November 5, 1967. He was buried in the Portal of the Folded Wings Shrine to Aviation at Valhalla Memorial Park Cemetery in Burbank, California.

Legacy
Squier was inducted into the Michigan Aviation Hall of Fame on October 2, 2004.

References

External links
 
 Eugene Downs: Squier

Burials at Valhalla Memorial Park Cemetery
Lockheed people
1893 births
1967 deaths
American test pilots
Deaths from cancer in California
People from Van Buren County, Michigan